New Moscow may refer to:

 New Moscow, Ohio, an unincorporated community in the United States
 New Moscow, Moscow, a territorial expansion of the city of Moscow, Russia
 Novaya Moskva, a number of inhabited localities in Russia
 1889 name of a Russian settlement in Sagallo, present-day Djibouti
 The New Moscow, a 1938 film
 , 1937 painting by Yuri Pimenov (1903-1977)
 , a village near Hoogeveen, Netherlands

See also
 Moscow (disambiguation)